Mesogastrura is a genus of springtails in the family Hypogastruridae. There are about five described species in Mesogastrura.

Species
These five species belong to the genus Mesogastrura:
 Mesogastrura boneti (Tarsia in Curia, 1941) i c g
 Mesogastrura coeca Cassagnau, 1959 i c g
 Mesogastrura libyca (Caroli, 1914) i c g
 Mesogastrura ojcoviensis (Stach, 1919) i c g
 Mesogastrura tiliophila (Loksa & Rubio, 1966) g
Data sources: i = ITIS, c = Catalogue of Life, g = GBIF, b = Bugguide.net

References

Further reading

 
 
 

Collembola
Springtail genera